Marsha Arzberger is a Democratic politician. She served as Arizona State Senator for District 25 from 2003 to 2008, and before that for District 8 from 2000 to 2001.

Personal information
Marsha Arzberger was born in St. Joseph, Missouri. She currently lives in Willcox, Arizona and has been an Arizona citizen since 1967.

Family
Marsha is married to Gus Arzberger and they have two children, two step-children, five grandchildren and two step-great-grandchildren.

Occupation
 Farmer/Rancher (retired)
 Arizona Board of Regents 1993–2000
 Assistant to the Director for Special Projects (higher education analyst)
 former Dean of Draughon's Business College and professor Oklahoma Junior College of Business and Technology
 Registered Medical Laboratory Technologist

Elected
 State Senate 2000–2001, District 8; State Senate 2003–2004, District 25
 Elected Precinct Committeeperson 1982–1996

Education
 Bachelor of Science in Education, Northwest Missouri State University (With Honors)
 Master's in Public Administration, Arizona State University (With Distinction)
 Graduate work toward a second master's degree in Political Science, ASU

Background and experience
 Marsha was raised on a farm in Missouri and worked her way through college with scholarships
 Dean of Draughon's Business College in Kansas City, MO; Professor, Oklahoma Junior College of Business and Technology
 Farmer / Rancher, partner with husband Gus in family farm and ranch businesses and owned and managed apartments
 Arizona Board of Regents (1993–2000), Assistant to the Director for Special Projects, focusing on higher education research.  Coordinated the 2000 Higher Education Arizona Town Hall *Background Report and authored two chapters.
 Registered Medical Laboratory Technologist

Appointments and boards
 Appointed to the Arizona Commission of Agriculture & Horticulture (Governor's appointment) 1979–1982
 Cochise College Foundation Board member since 1999

Personal achievements
 Private Pilot with instrument rating and over 5000 hours of flying experience
 Published author of a novel and approximately 18 journalism articles

Community service
 Civil Air Patrol – 30-year member.  Group Commander of Southeast Arizona; Command Search Pilot; Search and Rescue Mission Commander
 Volunteered at Willcox Elementary and Middle schools
 Served on Willcox, Arizona public schools community committees

Organizations
 Cochise College Foundation Board
 Civil Air Patrol
 Farm Bureau
 Cattle Growers
 Business & Professional Women
 AAUW (American Assoc. of University Women)
 National Organization of Women Legislators
 Cochise County Democrats
 Friends of the Library
 Sulphur Springs Historical Society
 League of Women Voters

Interim Committees
 Rural Physicians Study Committee (Co-chair)
 Ad Hoc Study Committee on State Retirees Health Benefits (Chair)
 Blue Ribbon Task Force on Effluent Reuse (Co-chair)
 Joint Legislative Study Committee on State Employee Compensation

References

External links

 Senator Marsha Arzberger – District 25 official State Senate website
 Profile at Project Vote Smart
 Follow the Money – Marsha Arzberger
 2006 2004 2002 2000 campaign contributions

1937 births
Living people
Arizona state senators
Women state legislators in Arizona
People from Willcox, Arizona
People from St. Joseph, Missouri
21st-century American politicians
21st-century American women politicians